Ryan Norman (born March 19, 1998, in Aurora, Ohio) is an American racing driver. Norman is a former motocross rider and is currently competing in the Michelin Pilot Challenge, driving for Bryan Herta Autosport and won the 2020 IMSA TCR Championship for the team. He formerly drove for Andretti Autosport in Indy Lights with multiple wins and podiums, and ran a race in the IndyCar Series in 2021 with Dale Coyne Racing.

Career
Norman started in motocross when he obtained an AMA at the age of twelve. When turning sixteen Norman's father invited Ryan for a three-day course at the Skip Barber Racing School. Norman joined the Skip Barber Winter Series for the first two rounds of the championship. In November 2015 the Ohio native finished seventh in his debut race, at Road Atlanta.

With driving coach Franklin Futrelle Norman joined the SCCA Formula Enterprises class in 2015. In his debut season Norman won the second race at Sebring International Raceway in the U.S. Majors Tour Southeastern Conference. After winning more races at Road Atlanta and Virginia International Raceway securing the second place in the championship. Comprent Motorsports driver Norman finished second at the prestigious June Sprints, behind multiple class champion Scott Rettich. Norman again finished second to Rettich at the prestigious SCCA National Championship Runoffs at Daytona International Speedway. At the end of the season Norman made his debut in a Formula Atlantic Swift 016.a. racing in the Historic Sportscar Racing organisation. At Sebring, the racing driver won his class.

For the 2016 season Norman stepped up to the Atlantic Championship joining K-Hill Motorsports coached by former ChampCar driver Tõnis Kasemets. Norman won both the Pro Atlantic Championship and the SCCA National Runoffs!

Norman raced with the SVRA organisation at selected events. At Mid-Ohio Norman made his debut in a 2007 Dallara Indy Lights racing car winning the race.

For 2017 Norman stepped up to the Indy Lights Championship driving for Andretti Autosport. After driving with the team in 2017, 2018 and 2019, with multiple race wins and podiums, Norman had his first IndyCar test with Andretti at Mid-Ohio Sports Car Course on June 25, 2019.

In 2020, Norman signed with Bryan Herta Autosport for a drive in the Michelin Pilot Challenge as a co-driver to Gabby Chaves and they both grabbed the 2020 IMSA Pilot TCR Championship.

Racing record

Career summary

† As he was a guest driver, Norman was ineligible to score points

SCCA National Championship Runoffs

American Open-Wheel racing results
(key) (Races in bold indicate pole position, races in italics indicate fastest race lap)

Atlantic Championship

Indy Lights

* Season still in progress

IndyCar Series
(key)

* Season still in progress.

References

External links
 Official website

1998 births
People from Aurora, Ohio
Racing drivers from Ohio
SCCA National Championship Runoffs winners
Atlantic Championship drivers
Indy Lights drivers
24 Hours of Daytona drivers
Living people
IndyCar Series drivers
Andretti Autosport drivers
Dale Coyne Racing drivers
WeatherTech SportsCar Championship drivers
SCCA National Championship Runoffs participants
Bryan Herta Autosport drivers
Michelin Pilot Challenge drivers